Harold Wade Lahar (July 14, 1919 – October 20, 2003) was an American football player and coach.  He served as the head football coach at Colgate University (1952–1956, 1962–1967) and the University of Houston (1957–1961).

Lahar was born in Durant, Oklahoma and attended Central High School in Oklahoma City. He later was an All-Big Six Conference guard for the Oklahoma Sooners under coach Tom Stidham. Lahar was selected 79th overall in the 1941 NFL Draft by the Chicago Bears, where he spent the 1941 NFL season before serving in the United States Navy in the South Pacific during World War II.

After leaving the service as a Lieutenant (junior grade) in 1945, Lahar played for the Buffalo Bills of the All-America Football Conference from 1946 to 1948 before beginning his college coaching career as an assistant under Otis Douglas at the University of Arkansas in 1950. In 1952, he became the 25th head coach at Colgate University in Hamilton, New York. In 1957, he succeeded Bill Meek at the University of Houston, where he spent five years, before returning to Colgate in 1962, making him the first man to return to a Division I head-coaching job after leaving for another school. Following the 1967 season, Lahar retired from coaching and served as athletic director at Colgate. His overall coaching record at Colgate was 53–40–8.

Lahar was also assistant commissioner of the Southwest Conference. He worked at the now-defunct SWC from 1973 until his retirement in 1983.  Upon his death in 2003, Lahar was buried in the Dallas-Fort Worth National Cemetery.

Head coaching record

References

External links
 

1919 births
2003 deaths
American football guards
Arkansas Razorbacks football coaches
Buffalo Bills (AAFC) players
Chicago Bears players
Colgate Raiders athletic directors
Colgate Raiders football coaches
Houston Cougars football coaches
Oklahoma Sooners football players
United States Navy personnel of World War II
United States Navy officers
People from Durant, Oklahoma
Southwest Conference